La Revue du Liban (full title: La Revue du Liban et de l'Orient Arabe) was a long-running French-language weekly magazine published in Beirut, Lebanon. It existed between 1928 and 2011.

History and profile
The magazine was founded in 1928. It was purchased by Dar Alf Leila Wa Leila publishing house which also published the Lebanese Arabic-language daily Al Bayrak and Al Hawadeth. The company was owned by Melhem Karam who also served as the editor-in-chief of La Revue du Liban. The print edition of the magazine ceased as the media company folded in 2011. The magazine continued as an online publication before folding altogether.

References

External links

1928 establishments in Lebanon
2011 disestablishments in Lebanon
Defunct magazines published in Lebanon
French-language magazines
Magazines established in 1928
Magazines disestablished in 2011
Online magazines with defunct print editions
Weekly magazines published in Lebanon
Magazines published in Beirut